Ibragim Magomedovich Saidov' (born March 9, 1985) is a Russian and Belarusian freestyle wrestler of Avar heritage. He won a bronze medal in the 125 kg weight division at the 2016 Olympics.

Saidau took up wrestling in 2000 in Khasavyurt, following his elder brother. He served a doping-related ban imposed by the Russian Anti-Doping Agency between May 2012 and June 2014. After the ban ended he represented Belarus.

References

External links
 

1985 births
Living people
Belarusian people of Dagestani descent
Belarusian male sport wrestlers
Olympic wrestlers of Belarus
Wrestlers at the 2016 Summer Olympics
Olympic bronze medalists for Belarus
Olympic medalists in wrestling
Medalists at the 2016 Summer Olympics